Bips or BIPS may refer to:

 Bips Investment Managers, a purveyor of exchange-traded funds
 Beta Investment Performance Securities
 Basis point, colloquially referred to in plural as bips
 Bipasha Basu (born 1979), an Indian actress whose nickname is Bips

See also
 BIP (disambiguation)